Darryl C. Williams (born February 29, 1968) is a Canadian former professional ice hockey player who played extensively in the minor leagues and played two games for the Los Angeles Kings of the National Hockey League during the 1992–93 season. He is also formerly an assistant coach for the New York Rangers. Williams was fired on April 7, 2018.

Coaching career
Williams was named Assistant Coach, Video on August 12, 2008. Williams joined the Canucks from the St. John's Fog Devils of the QMJHL, where he worked the previous four seasons as Associate Coach, Video Coordinator and Strength & Conditioning Coach. With his appointment to the Canucks' staff, Williams became the first Newfoundland native to serve in an NHL coaching position in league history.

Prior to joining St. John's, Williams served in a number of coaching capacities including head coaching duties with the Kansas City Outlaws of the United Hockey League, and assistant coach with the Cincinnati Mighty Ducks of the American Hockey League.

The Labrador City, Newfoundland native played 11 seasons in the American Hockey League and International Hockey League, highlighted by a two-game call up to the NHL with the Los Angeles Kings in the 1992-93 season. He is the first ever player from Labrador to play in the NHL.

On July 19, 2021, the Philadelphia Flyers hired Williams as an assistant coach for their NHL team.

Career statistics

Regular season and playoffs

References

External links

1968 births
Living people
Belleville Bulls players
Canadian ice hockey left wingers
Canadian ice hockey coaches
Hamilton Steelhawks players
Ice hockey people from Newfoundland and Labrador
Los Angeles Kings players
New Haven Nighthawks players
New York Rangers coaches
People from Labrador City
Philadelphia Flyers coaches
Phoenix Roadrunners (IHL) players
Sidney Capitals players
Undrafted National Hockey League players
Vancouver Canucks coaches
Victoria Cougars (WHL) players